The Island is a ZX Spectrum text adventure developed and released by Crystal Computing in 1983. The player is the survivor of a plane crash. The aim of the game is to find the valuable treasure and escape from the island.

Reception
"Compared to similar adventures, The Island is dull stuff with nothing out of the ordinary to recommend it.". Sinclair User

"It seems unlikely that any Spectrum owner will find it fun for more than a few minutes to play this repetitive, text-only adventure, which is filled with the programmer's inane humour". Sinclair Programs

References

External links
 
 

1980s interactive fiction
1983 video games
Europe-exclusive video games
Video games developed in the United Kingdom
Video games set on islands
ZX Spectrum games
ZX Spectrum-only games